Nils Martin Modéus (born 1 March 1962) is a Swedish theologian and bishop who is Archbishop of Uppsala and primate of the Church of Sweden. Modéus was ordained as a bishop on 6 March 2011 in Uppsala Cathedral.

Biography
Modéus was ordained a priest in 1986 for the Diocese of Växjö. He served as a curate and vicar of the parish of Byarum until 1988 when he became district leader and curate of the parish of Tullinge-Tumba in the Diocese of Stockholm. He held this position until 1995. In 1996, he was assigned by the Swedish church to write a book that resulted in the book Tradition och liv (Tradition and life) .

From 1997 to 1999 Modéus undertook a PhD in Old Testament exegesis at the University of Lund. From 2000 to 2003, Modéus worked once more as a curate in Tullinge-Tumba. In 2003 he took up the post of diocesan curate in the Diocese of Stockholm, responsible for church service development. He held this task until March 2011, when he was elected and ordained bishop of the Diocese of Linköping.

Martin Modéus is the son of junior lecturers Nils Modéus and Ingrid Modéus. He has two brothers: Fredrik Modéus, born in 1964, Bishop of the Diocese of Växjö and Daniel Modéus, born 1970, attorney in Stockholm. He is married to Marianne församlingspedagog Langby Modéus and has three children from a previous marriage.

On 8 June 2022 he was elected Archbishop of Uppsala and primate of the Church of Sweden and installed in Uppsala Cathedral on 4 December 2022.

References

Living people
1962 births
Swedish Lutheran bishops
Swedish Lutheran theologians
People from Jönköping
21st-century Lutheran bishops
21st-century Lutheran archbishops
Lutheran bishops of Linköping
Lutheran archbishops of Uppsala